Crawford Lake is a lake in Wright County, in the U.S. state of Minnesota.

Crawford Lake was named for an early settler.

See also
List of lakes in Minnesota

References

Lakes of Minnesota
Lakes of Wright County, Minnesota